Colorado (1923–1929) was a British Thoroughbred racehorse and sire. He won the 2000 Guineas in 1926 and the Eclipse Stakes in 1927. He was also noted for his rivalry with the Derby winner Coronach whom he defeated on three of their four meetings.

Background
Until the emergence of Fairway at the end of the decade, Colorado was regarded as the best racehorse sired by Phalaris, who became the most influential stallion of the 20th Century. His dam, Canyon, won the 1000 Guineas in 1916 and was a successful broodmare. In addition to Colorado she produced the Eclipse Stakes winner Caerleon.

He was a small, but powerfully built colt standing just over 15 hands, known to be a particular favourite of his owner, Lord Derby. He was trained at Lord Derby's Stanley House stable by George Lambton who found him a difficult horse to prepare because of his habit of "choking" in exercise gallops.

Racing career

1925: two-year-old season
Colorado was a leading two-year-old in 1925, winning the Coventry Stakes at Royal Ascot. In the Free Handicap, an official assessment of the year's two-year-olds, Colorado was assesses on 118lbs, eight pounds below the joint topweights Coronach and Legatee.

1926: three-year-old season
At three he won the Union Jack Stakes over a mile at Liverpool in March but worked poorly before the 2000 Guineas and started at 100/8 behind the strongly favoured Coronach. Colorado "dashed" into the lead in the final furlong and went clear to win by five lengths, giving Lord Derby his first win in the race.

He started favourite for the Derby but Coronach reversed the placings, winning by five lengths, with Colorado losing second place by a short head to Lancegaye. Weston, was certain that he would have at least been closer at Epsom if he had not been instructed to employ exaggerated waiting tactics. His cause was not helped when he had to swerve when a spectator's dog ran onto the course. In his next race Colorado started odds-on favourite for the Rous Memorial Stakes at Royal Ascot, but finished third of the four runners.

1927: four-year-old season
After having taken a long time to recover his form after the Derby, Colorado returned to beat Coronach in their two meetings in 1927. He was unplaced on his debut, but won the one and a half mile Newbury Summer Cup in June.

In a much anticipated race for the Princess of Wales's Stakes Tommy Weston tracked Coronach in the early stages before moving Colorado up to challenge for the lead. After a brief "duel" Colorado pulled away to win by eight lengths. In the Eclipse Stakes he beat the three-year-old Mario by six lengths with Coronach a length further back in third. In the Champion Stakes at Newmarket in October he was narrowly beaten by the French-trained Asterus and was retired to stud as the winner of nine races, worth £30,358.

Stud career
Colorado died on 16 September 1929, after only two seasons at stud, of gastroenteritis. He had made a promising start as a stallion, siring Felicitation who defeated Hyperion in the 1934 Ascot Gold Cup. He also got the Eclipse Stakes winner Loaningdale, Scarlet Tiger, who was third in the St. Leger, the top sprinter Coroado and the very versatile Colorado Kid.

Pedigree

 Colorado was inbred 3 × 4 to St Simon, meaning that this stallion appears in both the third and fourth generations of his pedigree.

References

 The Complete Encyclopedia of Horse Racing - written by Bill Mooney and George Ennor

1923 racehorse births
1929 racehorse deaths
Racehorses bred in the United Kingdom
Racehorses trained in the United Kingdom
Thoroughbred family 3-l
Chefs-de-Race
2000 Guineas winners